Future Teenage Cave Artists is the fifteenth studio album by American group Deerhoof. It was released on May 29, 2020 under Joyful Noise Recordings. A tour to support the release was scheduled for May and June 2020; however, these are being rescheduled due to COVID-19.

Two singles from the album, "Future Teenage Cave Artists" and "The Loved One" were released on March 25, 2020. The third single, "Farewell Symphony", was released April 20, 2020.

Greg Saunier said in an August 2020 interview that a "sort of a sequel" to Future Teenage Cave Artists would be "coming out in a couple months".

Critical reception
Future Teenage Cave Artists was met with generally favorable reviews from critics. At Metacritic, which assigns a weighted average rating out of 100 to reviews from mainstream publications, the album received an average score of 79, based on 10 reviews. Daniel Felsenthal of Pitchfork wrote, "...much of Future Teenage Cave Artists was recorded on laptops and phones, a tech-forward simplicity that reflects the album’s scrappy and cataclysmic milieu. It sounds less polished than their last couple of albums, but never as raw as their recently reissued early oeuvre...We’re left contemplating how a rock band, 26 years into their career, have managed to not only pin down the chaos of our time, but also to point toward our uncertain future."

Track listing

References

2020 albums
Joyful Noise Recordings albums
Deerhoof albums